Joakim Gruev (died 1912) was a Bulgarian teacher and translator. He was born on 9 September 1828 in the town of Koprivshtitsa. He was a teacher at the leading Bulgarian high school in Plovdiv. He was the author of a number of textbooks.

References

Bulgarian writers
Bulgarian educators
19th-century Bulgarian people
Members of the Bulgarian Academy of Sciences
People from Koprivshtitsa
1828 births
1912 deaths
19th-century Bulgarian educators